The Teatro Gran Rex  is an Art Deco style theatre in Buenos Aires, Argentina which opened on July 8, 1937, as the largest cinema in Argentina.

Located near the centre of the city at 857 Corrientes Avenue, it was designed by the architect Alberto Prebisch, who was also in charge of the construction of the Obelisk, one of the main icons of the city.

The design of the interior was influenced by that of  Radio City Music Hall in New York City and construction of the theatre was completed in just seven months in association with the engineer Adolfo Moret.  The opening caused a sensation and the Argentine intellectual Victoria Ocampo praised the theatre as an outstanding example of modern architecture from the pages of her influential literary journal, Sur.

Today, the theatre has 3,300 seats and, together with the Teatro Opera on the opposite side of the street, is one of the city's most important venues for the staging of international shows.

Chiquititas was the highest-grossing event in the history of the theater (Casi ángeles was the second). Based on the children-oriented soap of the same name and with the complete cast of the show, six seasons of live musicals were performed at the Gran Rex from 1996 to 2001 during the Winter Holidays. Over 1 million tickets were sold, with the 1998 season being the highest-selling season ever (and the highest attendance ever at the Gran Rex to this day): 240,000 tickets sold.

International performers

References
Ernesto Katzenstein. Argentine Architecture of the Thirties, J. Decorative & Propaganda Arts, Argentine Theme Issue, 1992.
Mimi Bohm. 'Buenos Aires Art Deco y Racionalismo''. Ediciones Xavier Verstraeten, Buenos Aires, 2008.
Arquitectura: Raúl Prebisch

External links

 

Theatres in Buenos Aires
Theatres completed in 1937
Art Deco architecture in Argentina
1937 establishments in Argentina